Brandon Revenberg (born December 16, 1992) is a Canadian football offensive lineman for the Hamilton Tiger-Cats of the Canadian Football League (CFL).

College career
He played college football at Grand Valley State.

Professional career
He was drafted third overall by the Tiger-Cats in the 2016 CFL Draft and signed with the team on May 27, 2016.

In 2019, he was the Hamilton Tiger-Cats Most Outstanding Canadian. He re-signed with the Tiger-Cats on January 13, 2021.

References

External links
Hamilton Tiger-Cats bio

1992 births
Living people
Players of Canadian football from Ontario
Canadian football offensive linemen
Hamilton Tiger-Cats players
Grand Valley State Lakers football players